The Aruba Cup was an annual team golf competition between teams representing PGA Tour Latinoamérica and PGA Tour Canada. It was founded in 2016 and took place in December.

The 2016 and 2017 events were held at the Tierra del Sol Resort, Spa & Country Club near Noord, Aruba. In 2018 the event was played at Cozumel Country Club on the island of Cozumel in the Caribbean Sea off the eastern coast of Mexico's Yucatán Peninsula and was called the Cozumel Cup.

Format
The teams consisted of 10 golfers from each tour. The tournament was played over three days with 5 fourball matches on the first day, 5 foursomes on the second day and 10 singles matches on the final day. One point was awarded for each win and a half point for a halved match. With a total of 20 points, a team needed to get 10.5 points to win the Cup.

In 2016 and 2017 prize money was US$8,000 for members of the winning team and $4,000 for each member of the losing team, a total of $120,000.

History
The inaugural event was held December 15–17, 2016. The captains were Julián Etulain and Stephen Ames. PGA Tour Latinoamérica won the cup 13–7, despite PGA Tour Canada winning the singles 5½–4½. The teams consisted of the leading 10 in the Order of Merit with a minimum of either 5 players from Latin American countries or 5 Canadians.

The second event was held December 14–16, 2017. The team captains were Roberto Díaz and Ben Silverman.  PGA Tour Canada won the cup 10½–9½, despite PGA Tour Latinoamérica winning the singles 6–4. The contest was decided in the last match to finish when T. J. Vogel halved his match against Brady Schnell, both players making bogeys on the final hole. The teams consisted of the leading 10 in the Order of Merit.

The third event was held December 13–15, 2018 at Cozumel Country Club. Playing captains were chosen for the first time; Harry Higgs and Sam Fidone. PGA Tour Latinoamérica won the cup 11½–8½. They led 6–4 are the first two days but lost the first four singles matches. However, in the last six singles they won five and halved the other, for a three point victory.

Results

Teams

PGA Tour Latinoamérica
2016: Samuel Del Val, Andrés Echavarría, Seth Fair, Nate Lashley, Sebastián MacLean, Leandro Marelli, Augusto Núñez, Eric Steger, Martin Trainer, Tom Whitney
2017: Rodolfo Cazaubón, Óscar Fraustro, Tee-K Kelly, Hank Lebioda, Nelson Ledesma, Brian Richey, José de Jesús Rodríguez, Brady Schnell, José Toledo, Jared Wolfe
2018: Tyson Alexander, Michael Buttacavoli, Nico Echavarría, Matt Gilchrest, Harry Higgs, Horacio León, Ben Polland, Marcelo Rozo, Austin Smotherman, Eric Steger

PGA Tour Canada
2016: Paul Barjon, Austin Connelly, Corey Conners, Adam Cornelson, Michael Gligic, Brock Mackenzie, Dan McCarthy, Taylor Moore, Max Rottluff, Ryan Williams
2017: Kramer Hickok, Rico Hoey, Lee McCoy, Patrick Newcomb, Jordan Niebrugge, Max Rottluff, Johnny Ruiz, Robby Shelton, T. J. Vogel, Chase Wright
2018: Mark Anguiano, George Cunningham, Sam Fidone, Michael Gellerman, Ben Griffin, Ian Holt, Blake Olson, Corey Pereira, Danny Walker, Zach Wright

References

External links

Coverage on PGA Tour website

Team golf tournaments
Sports competitions in Aruba
Golf tournaments in Mexico
Recurring sporting events established in 2016
Recurring sporting events disestablished in 2018